Bertie County Courthouse is a historic courthouse building located at Windsor, Bertie County, North Carolina. It was built in 1889, and is a 2 1/2-story, brick Neoclassical style building with a gable roof topped by a polygonal cupola.  In 1941, the portico was enlarged and wings added to the main block.  A rear addition was built in 1974.

It was added to the National Register of Historic Places in 1979. It is located in the Windsor Historic District.

References

County courthouses in North Carolina
Courthouses on the National Register of Historic Places in North Carolina
Government buildings completed in 1889
Buildings and structures in Bertie County, North Carolina
National Register of Historic Places in Bertie County, North Carolina
1889 establishments in North Carolina
Individually listed contributing properties to historic districts on the National Register in North Carolina